MBCS may refer to:

 Member of the Chartered Institute for I.T., denoting membership at a professional level
 Multi Byte Character Set, a class of character encodings in computing
 Marine Biology Case Study, a discontinued case study in the AP Computer Science program